Mujaid Sadick Aliu (born 14 March 2000), simply known as Mujaid, is a Spanish professional footballer who plays for Belgian club Genk as a central defender.

Club career
Born in Logroño, La Rioja to parents from Nigeria and Ghana, Mujaid joined Deportivo de La Coruña's youth setup in 2016, from Valvanera CD. He made his senior debut with the reserves on 22 October 2017, coming on as a late substitute for Ismael Díaz in a 2–1 Segunda División B away win against CDA Navalcarnero.

Mujaid made his first team – and La Liga – debut on 12 May 2018, replacing Juanfran late into a 2–4 home loss against Villarreal CF.

Career statistics

Club

Honours
Spain U18
Mediterranean Games: Gold Medal 2018

References

External links

2000 births
Living people
Sportspeople from Logroño
Spanish footballers
Footballers from La Rioja (Spain)
Association football defenders
La Liga players
Segunda División players
Segunda División B players
Tercera División players
Belgian Pro League players
Deportivo Fabril players
Deportivo de La Coruña players
K.R.C. Genk players
Spain youth international footballers
Spanish sportspeople of African descent
Spanish people of Nigerian descent
Spanish people of Ghanaian descent
Competitors at the 2018 Mediterranean Games
Mediterranean Games gold medalists for Spain
Mediterranean Games medalists in football
Spanish expatriate footballers
Expatriate footballers in Belgium